The Church of All Souls is located on Every Street in Ancoats, Manchester, England.

It was designed by William Hayley, and was constructed 1839–1840; in a Romanesque style, from brown brick with stone dressing. It was built for Samuel Warren. It has been a Grade II listed building since 15 October 1984. The church closed in 1984, and the building was subsequently used as a joinery workshop. It is now used by the Manchester Miracle Centre.

See also

Listed buildings in Manchester-M4
List of Commissioners' churches in Northeast and Northwest England

References 

Churches completed in 1840
Grade II listed churches in Manchester
Former churches in Greater Manchester